Rai Chand Boral (19 October 1903 – 25 November 1981) was an Indian composer, considered by music connoisseurs to be the Bhishma Pitamah, the father of film music in India.

He was awarded the Dadasaheb Phalke Award, the highest award in Indian cinema, given by Government of India, in 1978, and also in the same year, the Sangeet Natak Akademi award, given by the Sangeet Natak Akademi, India's National Academy for Music, Dance and Drama.

Early life and training
(Bengali: রায চন্দ্র বরাল) Boral was born in Calcutta. His father, Lal Chand Boral, was a classical musician (expert of Dhrupad). He had three sons, and Rai Chand was the youngest. Musicians from Rampur and Gwalior were invited for lessons. These include Ustad Mushtaq Hussain Khan of Rampur-Sahaswan gharana, Masit Khan (tabla player), and Ustad Hafiz Ali Khan (sarod player). Rai Chand learnt "Sath Sangat" on the tabla and attended music conferences in Lucknow, Allahabad, and Benares.

Career
Raichand Boral is often credited to be the pioneer of Indian film music. Along with Pankaj Mullick, he was in charge of New Theatres' music department. New Theatres set standards in film music which have rarely been approached since.  They also shaped film music in its early days and their format was followed for the most part for first 20–30 years in Hindi film music. He was also responsible for shaping Saigal's budding career. Anil Biswas called Boral 'Bhishma Pitamah of film music'.

Boral joined the Indian Broadcasting Company in the year of its inception, 1927. In 1931, he shifted to the New Theatres in the silent era for supporting the stage with live music. He dissolved the Ghazal style of singing from Northern India into the 19th Century Bengali tunes with string instrument medium. In 1935, he introduced playback singing for the first time in the Hindi feature film Dhoop Chhaon (1935). The song, "Main Khush Hona Chahun", had an all women chorus led by Parul Ghosh with Suprabha Sarkar and Harimati picturised in a dance sequence. After arriving in Bombay in 1953, Boral composed music for Dard-e-Dil (1953) with Lata's songs. Music for some basic records were composed by him. Anjangarh (1948) was his last famous film with New Theatres. He is correctly complimented by late Anil Biswas as the Father of Indian Cinema Music. He had directed the music of 70–75 (?) films (excluding live scores of silent movies) including Hindi and Bengali films.

He received the Dadasaheb Phalke Award the highest award in Indian cinema, given by Government of India, in 1978 at the age of 75. Also in the same year he received the Sangeet Natak Akademi award in the Creative and Experimental music category, the highest award for a performing artist, conferred by the Sangeet Natak Akademi, India's National Academy for Music, Dance and Drama.

He died in 1981 at the age of 78.

Hindi filmography

Mohabbat Ke Ansu (1932)
Zinda Lash (1932)
Subah Ka Sitara (1932)
Puran Bhagat
Rajrani Meera (1933) (Hindi)
Meerabai (1933) (Bengali)
Dulari Bibi (1933)
Chandidas (1934)
Daku Mansoor (1934)
Mohabbat Ki Kasauti (1934)
After the Earthquake (1935)?
Karwan-E-Hayat (1935) (with Mihirkiron Bhattacharya)
Dhoop Chhaon (1935) (with Pankaj Mullick)
Inquilab (1935)
Manzil (1936) (with Pankaj Mullick)
Karodpati a.k.a. Millionaire (1936) (with Pankaj Mullick)
Anath Aashram 1937
Vidyapati 1937
President 1937 (with Pankaj Mullick)
Abhagin 1938
Street Singer 1938
Sathi 1938 Bengali version of Street Singer
Jawani Ki Reet 1939
Sapera 1939
Haar Jeet 1940
Lagan 1941
Nari 1942 (not sure Bengali or Hindi)
Saugand 1942
Waapas 1943
Hamrahi (1945)
Wasiatnaama 1945
Anjangarh 1948
Pahela Admi 1950
Swami Vivekanand 1950 (1955?)
Dard-e-Dil 1953
Shri Chaitanya Mahaprabhu 1954
Amar Saigal 1955 (with Pankaj Mullick and Timir Baran)
 Nilachale Mahaprabhu (1957)

Bengali filmography
Dena Paona (1931)
Punarjanma 1932
Chirakumar Sabha 1932
Palli Samaj 1932
Chandidas 1932
Rajrani Meera 1932
Mastuto Bhai 1933
Kapalkundala 1933
Meerabai 1933
Ruplekha 1934
Excuse Me Sir 1934
Debdas 1935 (with Pankaj Mullick)
Bhagyachakra 1935
Grihadaha 1936 (with Pankaj Mullick)
Maya 1936 (with Pankaj Mullick)
Barababu 1937
Didi 1937 (with Pankaj Mullick)
Bidypati 1937
Abhigyan 1938
Sathi 1938
Sapudey 1939
Rajat Jayani 1939
Parajay 1939
Abhinetri 1940
Parichay 1941
Prastisruti 1941
Udayer Pathey 1944
Biraj Bou 1946
Anjangarh 1948
Mantramugda 1949
Bishnupriya 1949
Mantramugdha 1949
Bara Bou 1950
Sparshamani 1951
Paritran 1952
Maa 1952
Neelachaley Mohaprabhu 1957
Sagar Sangame 1959
Natun Fasal 1960

References

External links
 
Musicians
A short history of Bengali cinema

1903 births
1981 deaths
Dadasaheb Phalke Award recipients
Indian male musicians
University of Calcutta alumni
Bengali musicians
Hindi film score composers
Recipients of the Sangeet Natak Akademi Award
20th-century composers
20th-century Indian musicians
Indian male film score composers
20th-century male musicians
Musicians from Kolkata